The 1916 WAFL season was the 32nd season of the West Australian Football League.

Ladder

Grand Final

References

External links
Official WAFL website

West Australian Football League seasons
WAFL